Glassell Park Elementary School is an elementary school listed on the National Register of Historic Places. It is located at 2211 W. Avenue 30, in the Glassell Park neighborhood of Los Angeles, California.  It is a PK-6 active school. The principal is Ms. Claudia Pelayo. It is a part of the Los Angeles Unified School District (LAUSD).

It was built in 1924 in Spanish Colonial Revival style. Following the 1933 Long Beach earthquake it was updated in P.W.A. Moderne architecture to make repairs and to meet new earthquake-related building codes. Elementary schools in Los Angeles were a part of the Los Angeles City School District until July 1, 1961, when it merged into LAUSD.

The school's main presentation to the public is its long, south-facing facade along W. Avenue 30 of length .  Its  building frontage on Carlyle Street is less visible.

The property was deemed notable partly in the area of social history.

Only the 1924/35 school building and its portion of grounds were deemed to be contributing resources.  Modular classrooms, playground areas, and a 1951-built cafeteria were considered intrusions that do not add to the historic character of the property.

See also

 List of Registered Historic Places in Los Angeles
 List of Los Angeles Unified School District schools
 Andrew Glassell

References

External links
 Glassell Park Elementary School website

Schools in Los Angeles
Glassell Park, Los Angeles
Los Angeles Unified School District schools
Public elementary schools in California
School buildings on the National Register of Historic Places in Los Angeles
Mission Revival architecture in California
1924 establishments in California
Educational institutions established in 1924